Captain Sir Eyre Massey Shaw KCB (17 January 1830 – 25 August 1908) was the first Chief Officer of the Metropolitan Fire Brigade (now renamed the London Fire Brigade), and the Superintendent of its predecessor, the London Fire Engine Establishment, from 1861 to 1891.  He introduced modern firefighting methods to the Brigade, and increased the number of stations. He was also in the British Army.

Early career
Shaw was born in Ballymore, County Cork, Ireland and was educated first at a school in Queenstown and then at Trinity College, Dublin. Shaw considered joining the Church but decided on a career in the Army and gained a commission in the North Cork Rifles, a militia regiment of the British Army (later the 9th Battalion, King's Royal Rifle Corps) from 1854 to 1860, reaching the rank of captain. He resigned from the Army on being appointed Chief Constable of Belfast Borough Police in June 1860, in charge of both the police and the fire brigade. In September 1861, following the death of the then head, James Braidwood, in the line of duty while fighting a massive fire in Tooley Street, Shaw was engaged as head of the London Fire Engine Establishment.

Metropolitan Fire Brigade

In 1865, Parliament passed the Metropolitan Fire Brigade Act, placing responsibility for fire protection in the Metropolitan Fire Brigade (combining the former London Fire Engine Establishment and the Society for the Protection of Life from Fire), to be supervised by the Metropolitan Board of Works.  Shaw headed the new brigade.

Shaw was an influential thinker on firefighting, publishing at least one book on the subject. He is noted for his introduction of uniforms and the famous brass helmets (c. 1868), and for introducing a ranking system. He also introduced the use of the electrical telegraph for communication between stations (c. 1867), and stand pipes and fire hydrants.

As London grew during the late 19th century, Shaw expanded the number of fire stations. In 1861, the LFEE had comprised 17 land and two river stations and 129 men; when he retired 30 years later, the brigade's estate comprised 55 land and four river stations, 127 street escape and hose-cart stations, 675 personnel and 131 horses. Sloping floors in fire stations allowed engines to move out more easily ('on the run', a term still used today). Under his leadership, he also procured steam fire engines, contacting the main manufacturers, Merryweather & Sons and Shand Mason, and working with them to develop an engine which could be pulled by two horses and produce several jets at high pressure (on average, 300 gallons of water per minute).

Shaw was a well-known socialite (which led to his immortalisation in operetta, see below) and a personal friend of the Prince of Wales (later Edward VII).  A firefighting outfit was always kept ready at Charing Cross Fire Station in case the Royal heir chose to firefight.

When the Fire Brigade was taken over by the London County Council in 1889, he disagreed with the administration and resigned in 1891.  He was knighted by Queen Victoria on his last day of service. Shaw died at Folkestone on 25 August 1908 and is buried in the east side of Highgate Cemetery.

Theatre fire safety
In his work with the Fire Engine Establishment and later the Metropolitan Fire Brigade, Shaw became most concerned with the fire safety of theatres. Theatres were frequent sources of fire, with combustible scenery covered in oil paints in close proximity to naked flame gas lamps.

Such was his concern, that in 1876, he published the book Fires in Theatres, setting out some of the risks and methods specific to theatres. He was particularly concerned with the lack of regulation and control in the sector.

In 1887, the devastating Exeter Theatre Royal fire claimed the lives of 186 people, and Shaw was appointed to conduct a parliamentary inquiry (with a jury) and to report back. The jury of 21 returned a verdict of accidental death.

Shaw submitted his report to the government on 29 September 1887, and in it he placed the blame firmly with the architect, Phipps. Phipps defended himself from the blame, deflecting to the fact that a number of changes had been made during construction from the designs that he proposed.

This proved to be the catalyst for action, and gradually regulations were tightened.

Published works
Shaw published a number of books:
 Fires and Fire Brigades
 Fire Protection: A complete manual
 Fire Surveys: A summary of the principles to be observed in estimating the risk of buildings
 Instructions for the use and management of Fire escapes and the rescue of life from fire
 Instructions concerning Branches and Nozzles
 Fire in Theatres
 Instructions concerning air and water

Cultural influence and legacy
Shaw is best remembered today as the "Captain Shaw" to whom the Fairy Queen in Gilbert and Sullivan's Iolanthe addresses herself, wondering if his "brigade with cold cascade" could quench her great love, a reference to Shaw's popularity with certain aristocratic ladies of the town.  Shaw was present in the stalls at the first night of Iolanthe in 1882, and Alice Barnett, playing the Fairy Queen, addressed herself directly to him. Legend has it that he stood up and took a bow. In 1886 Shaw was named in an adultery lawsuit involving Lady Colin Campbell who was sitting next to Shaw at the Iolanthe premiere.

In conjunction with professor John Tyndall of the Royal Society, Shaw designed a fire respirator for the use of his firefighters.

The London brigade's 1935 fireboat was named Massey Shaw in his honour.

Winchester House, the headquarters of the Metropolitan Fire brigade in Southwark, which also included a residence for Shaw, later became the London Fire Brigade Museum (now closed); an English Heritage Blue plaque still adorns the building and states that Shaw lived there.

Gallery

References

External links

 
 The Fireboat Massey Shaw

1830 births
1908 deaths
London Fire Brigade personnel
People from County Cork
British Militia officers
King's Royal Rifle Corps officers
Alumni of Trinity College Dublin
Irish police chiefs
Knights Commander of the Order of the Bath
British Chief Constables
Burials at Highgate Cemetery